János Vajda may refer to:
János Vajda (poet) (1827–1897), Hungarian poet
János Vajda (composer) (born 1949), Hungarian composer